Bogosavac is a village in the Šabac municipality in western Serbia. The village has a Serb ethnic majority and its population numbers 1,159 people (2002 census).

Culture
After World War II, the football club Sloga ("Unity") was established, competing since in the lower leagues.

The local Orthodox church was built in the late 1980s from local contribution. It is dedicated to the Virgin Mary.

Anthropology
Larger families living in Bogosavac are the Srnić, Marinković, Vučetić, and Jovanić.

See also
List of places in Serbia
Mačva

Mačva
Populated places in Mačva District